Tommy Togiai (born September 19, 1999) is an American football defensive tackle for the Cleveland Browns of the National Football League (NFL). He played college football at Ohio State.

Early years
Togiai attended Highland High School in Pocatello, Idaho. As a senior, he was the Idaho Gatorade Football Player of the Year after recording 93 tackles, 11 sacks and an interception. Togiai played in the 2018 U. S. Army All-American Bowl. He committed to Ohio State University to play college football.

College career
As a true freshman at Ohio State in 2018, Togiai played in 12 games and had 10 tackles. As a sophomore he had 16 tackles in 14 games. As a junior he had 23 tackles and three sacks. He was forced to miss the 2021 College Football Playoff National Championship due to COVID-19 protocols.

Professional career
Togiai was selected by the Cleveland Browns with the 132nd overall pick in the 2021 NFL Draft. On May 21, 2021, Togiai signed his four-year rookie contract with Cleveland.

References

External links
Ohio State Buckeyes bio

1999 births
Living people
Sportspeople from Pocatello, Idaho
Players of American football from Idaho
American football defensive tackles
Ohio State Buckeyes football players
Cleveland Browns players